Zachary A. Vane (May 16, 1892 – February 8, 1993) was an American politician in the state of Washington.

Vane served in the Washington House of Representatives as a Democrat from the 29th district from 1933 until his appointment to the State Senate on January 9, 1953, after Donald W. Eastvold resigned to become the Attorney General of Washington. He served in the Senate until 1955. In 1957, after state representative John G. McCutcheon resigned the seat in the House of Representatives which Vane had previously held, he was appointed to fulfill the unexpired term, and would serve until 1961. Vane, who was born in Wisconsin, was a realtor, and lived in Tacoma, Washington since 1914. In 1993, he died at the age of 100.

References

1993 deaths
1892 births
People from Marinette County, Wisconsin
Businesspeople from Tacoma, Washington
Democratic Party Washington (state) state senators
Democratic Party members of the Washington House of Representatives
American centenarians
Men centenarians
American real estate brokers
Politicians from Tacoma, Washington
20th-century American politicians